Kharuzak (also Romanized as Kharūzak and Kharoozak; also known as Khūrīk, Kharūzān, and Khūrīzak) is a village in Dashtabi-ye Gharbi Rural District, Dashtabi District, Buin Zahra County, Qazvin Province, Iran. At the 2006 census, its population was 41, in 9 families.

References 

Populated places in Buin Zahra County